Arts Engine is a film organization whose activities include documentary film production, a social-issue film festival and a virtual commons for filmmakers, activists, educators and students to share information. Arts Engine will premiere its eleventh annual Media That Matters Film Festival on October 27, 2011.

History

Arts Engine began under the leadership of co-founders Katy Chevigny and Julia Pimsleur in 1997 when they formed a partnership to create social issue documentaries. These two social activists developed the core values and beliefs that have informed all of their subsequent projects with 11 feature-length documentaries created since 1997. The Emmy-nominated film Deadline, reaching sizable audiences. In 2000, during the height of the internet boom, Chevigny and Pimsleur realized that social issue filmmaking was changing. A new culture was emerging that would change media from televised monologues to internet-driven dialogues. Electronically facilitated dialogue and distribution channels opened opportunities to build new online communities.

Committed to breaking down traditional hierarchies, Arts Engine launched the online commons for filmmakers and activists, called MediaRights.org, a comprehensive database of social issue documentaries with over 7,400 films registered. This led to the creation of the Youth Media Dissemination Initiative (YMDi.org). They also developed the Media That Matters Film Festival, one of the first online film festivals. Now in its eleventh year, the festival reaches tens of thousands of people annually and hosts hundreds of internet pages of information with “Take Action Links” on everything from AIDS in Africa, to water rights in Michigan, to the youth vote, LGBT issues, and sustainability. The ballast for this activism from 1997 onwards is the belief that visual storytelling on social issues can make change.

Big Mouth Films

Big Mouth Films produces feature-length, social issue documentaries independently and in collaboration with numerous companies and organizations. Big Mouth is best known for the Emmy-nominated film Deadline.

(A)sexual (2011)

Faced with a sex obsessed culture, a mountain of stereotypes and misconceptions, and a lack of social or scientific research, asexuals — people who do not feel sexual desire — try to declare their identity. (A)sexual follows the growth of a community that experiences no sexual attraction. In 2000, David Jay came out to his parents. He was asexual and was fine with it. And he was not alone. Studies show that 1% of the population is asexual. But in a society obsessed with sex, how do you deal with life as an outsider? Combining intimate interviews, verite footage, and animation with fearless humor and pop culture imagery, David and our four other characters grapple with this universal question and the outcomes might surprise you.

(A)sexual made its world premiere at the Frameline Film Festival on June 18, 2011.

Pushing the Elephant (2010)

In the late 1990s, Rose Mapendo lost her family and home to the violence that engulfed the Democratic Republic of the Congo. She emerged advocating forgiveness and reconciliation. In a country where ethnic violence has created seemingly irreparable rifts among Tutsis, Hutus and other Congolese, this remarkable woman is a vital voice in her beleaguered nation's search for peace. Now, Rose is confronted with teaching one of her most recalcitrant students how to forgive — Nangabire, the daughter who remained behind.  When war came to Rose's village, she was separated from Nangabire, then just five years old. Rose managed to escape with nine of her ten children and was eventually resettled in Phoenix, Arizona. Over a decade later, mother and daughter are reunited in the US where they must face the past and build a new future.

Pushing the Elephant follows Rose and Nangabire over the course of a year as they make up for lost time. Rose struggles to find balance in her life as a mother of ten and a full-time advocate for refugees and peace.  Her work takes her around the world from speaking at the White House to addressing the UNHCR in Geneva to convening a grassroots meeting of refugees in Burundi.  Meanwhile, Nangabire, now seventeen, must adapt to America and discover how she fits into the sprawling Mapendo family. As mother and daughter get to know one another, they must come to terms with a painful past, and define what it means to be a survivor, a woman, a refugee and an American.

Pushing the Elephant was directed by Beth Davenport and Elizabeth Mandel. It was screened on PBS's award-winning series Independent Lens in early 2011.

The Dishes (in production)

This intimately revealing story takes the viewer from the band's local haunts of Chicago to life on the road during their US tour. Through interviews and vérité footage, the film captures the realities of The Dishes’ life on the road and what it takes to endure the feat of holding it all together, a side of the brass tacks of rock rarely seen.

Election Day (2007)

On November 2, 2004, millions of Americans put the world's most famous democracy to the test at polling places across the country. Election Day follows a dozen of these citizens—from the plains of South Dakota to the palm trees of southern Florida-over the course of twenty-four hours. Uplifting yet troubling, their experiences offer rare insight into a hallowed American ritual.

Election Day premiered at South by Southwest Film Festival (SXSW) in 2007 and will be broadcast on public television in 2008.

Arctic Son (2006)

In the tiny Arctic village of Old Crow a father and son are reunited after 20 years apart. Stanley Sr. is a hunter, a rugged man of the land steeped in Native Vuntut Gwitchin traditions. Seattle-raised Stanley Jr., immerses himself in hip hop and partying. As their worlds collide, this moving father-son journey becomes a larger exploration of the complex relationship between tradition and modernity; nature and pop culture; addiction and independence; and the bigger quest we all embark at some point—the need to know who we are and where we belong.

Arctic Son was released on POV on August 21, 2007.

Deadline (2004)

What would you do if you discovered that thirteen people slated for execution had been found innocent? That was exactly the question that Illinois Governor George Ryan faced in his final days in office. Deadline is a compelling look insider America's prisons, highlighting one man's unlikely and historic actions against the system.

Deadline won the Thurgood Marshall Journalism Award and was nominated for an Emmy.

Journey to the West (2001)

Journey to the West explores the origins of traditional Chinese medicine, how it is used in modern-day China, and how it has been adapted in the United States. The film features rare footage of traditional medical practices in the People's Republic of China and interviews of leading Chinese medical practitioners in the United States.

Outside Looking In (2001)

This film brings together the stories of three families with trans-racially adopted children of three different races, across three generations.  It captures a baby's transition from natural parents to adoptive parents, and it delves into the complexity of racial identity for these children who are physically bonded to one race and emotionally bonded to another.

Brother Born Again (2000)

Julia Pimsleur travels to Alaska to reconnect with her brother, who has moved to a remote island there following his conversion to Christianity.  He has lived with his family there for ten years since dropping out of college to become a born again Christian, while Julia is a bisexual, Jewish New Yorker.  The film is a funny and touching exploration of what it means to be a family.

Nuyorican Dream (2000)

Nuyorican Dream is the story of a New York Puerto Rican family contending with urban poverty.  Robert is the only person in his family who has finished high school and college, an accomplishment that was supposed to give him access to the American dream, but has alienated him from his family.  His sisters Beti and Tati are struggling with drug addictions and his brother Danny is in and out of prison, while the family subsists on his mother's welfare checks and earnings from selling pasteles and clothing on the street.  What sustains the Gutierrezes is their support and love for one another. Clips from the movie were used in a radio story for this American life covering the same topic.

Innocent Until Proven Guilty (1999)

James Forman, Jr. is a public defender and the son of civil rights activist James Forman.  He has decided to follow in his father's footsteps and address issues of race as they manifest themselves today.  The documentary gives viewers insight into Forman's work at the Public Defender Service and at an alternative high school for juvenile ex-offenders, which he co-founded.  It asks challenging questions about our prison system and the criminalization of African American juveniles.

Media That Matters Film Festival

Launching its eleventh year, the Media That Matters Film Festival is an interactive, yearlong celebration of short, high impact films on immigration, global warming, fair trade, gay rights, sustainable agriculture and many other pressing social issues.  During its highly successful six-year history, Media That Matters has presented films that have gone on to catalyze national legislation, change corporate hiring practices, spur social action and inspire a new generation of filmmakers.

Past awards ceremonies have included presentations by Ira Glass, Byron Hurt, Tim Robbins, Al Franken, Chuck D, Woody Harrelson, Academy Award winner Barbara Kopple, Arrested Development's David Cross, Reiko Aylesworth of 24 and comedian Sam Seder.

As with each previous year, these new Media That Matters films will stream online at www.mediathatmattersfest.org starting in late 2011. The site provides high quality video feeds, “take action links” and viewer forums on the social issues addressed in the films. The collection will embark on a tour of 100+ locations across the United States and around the world. With nationwide distribution through Netflix, “do-it-yourself” screenings all over the country, and a high impact outreach campaign, Media That Matters is set to inspire hundreds of thousands of students, teachers, filmmakers, social activists and just about anyone to take action.

MediaRights.org

MediaRights.org has become the nation's most comprehensive resource for issue-oriented media.  Started initially as an online database of social issue documentaries, MediaRights.org has been a catalyst for social change, inspiring workshops, new educational materials and interactive screenings for filmmakers, activists and educators across the country.  Currently MediaRights.org is the source for over 26,000 registered members and hosts more than 7,400 films in its online database. Moreover, MediaRights.org has helped provide access to thousands of films that have through the years been used to encourage public dialogue and civic engagement by activists throughout the country.

Mission statement

Arts Engine, Inc. supports, produces, and distributes independent media of consequence and promotes the use of independent media by advocates, educators and the general public. By fostering the production and use of independent film, video and new media, Arts Engine connects media makers and active audiences in order to spur critical consideration of pressing social issues.

The governing philosophy of Arts Engine is that the work of independent media makers is crucial to the enrichment of society and culture. With the growing consolidation of media worldwide, independent media makers face daunting obstacles in their efforts to introduce new perspectives into public debate. Advocates, educators and the public have limited access to media that illustrates a variety of points of view. In order to support the presence of diverse perspectives in our society, Arts Engine is dedicated to forging vital links between media makers and the public, and to realizing independent media’s potential for broad social impact.

References

External links
 http://www.mediathatmattersfest.org
 http://www.mediarights.org
 https://web.archive.org/web/20070612225516/http://www.artsengine.net/
 http://www.ymdi.org
 https://web.archive.org/web/20070609131435/http://deadlinethemovie.com/
 http://www.electiondaythemovie.com
 https://web.archive.org/web/20110622211547/http://www.bigmouthfilms.org/
 Studio Daily, 2006
  Creative Planet
 Media that Matters Film Festival (video) 2008
 PBS (bio of Katy Chevigny) 2008
 Documentaries, 2010 (with poster)
 NYTimes, 2004

Film organizations in the United States